Darowa may refer to:
Darová, a village in Břasy, Czech Republic
Darova, Romania

See also
Eldarov or El'darova, an Azerbaijani and Russian surname